Janet Monge is the keeper and curator of the physical anthropology section at the Penn Museum, the Associate Director and Manager of the Penn Museum Casting Program, and Adjunct Associate Professor at the University of Pennsylvania. Philadelphia Magazine named Monge "Best Museum Curator" in 2014. Monge's work covers nearly the entire spectrum of biological anthropology from paleoanthropology to forensic anthropology. Her research interests include human evolution, human skeletal biology, bioarchaeology, and life-history/paleodemography. Furthermore, she volunteers her time as an expert witness in criminal defense cases and as a forensic consultant to police. One of the most notable cases to which Monge has contributed was the analysis of the burnt remains of the 1985 MOVE bombing victims. She used remains from the bombing for teaching at the University of Pennsylvania and Princeton University without the family's knowledge or consent. Monge's scientific and curatorial work has been covered in the press and in popular media.

Life and career 
Monge earned her doctorate at the University of Pennsylvania in 1991. During her PhD, she was hired to analyze the burned remains of the MOVE-bombing victims. However, she reached different conclusions about some remains' identities than the city's special commission on MOVE. Since then, she has volunteered her service on a variety of forensic cases in Philadelphia. Despite her forensic skills, Monge's main work actually focuses on several topics including the preservation and accessibility of Computed Topography (CT) datasets, traditional radiology, human dental micro-anatomy, and production and distribution of high quality fossil casts. As the Associate Director and Manager of the Casting Program, Monge oversees 3000 molds and casts representing fossils from every phase of human evolution. Her non-profit efforts ensure museums and universities around the world have access to unique specimens. She also travels worldwide to mold recently excavated fossils to include in the collection. Monge has also received a $1.7 million dollar grant from the National Science Foundation to curate a human evolution exhibit at the Penn Museum titled "HUMAN EVOLUTION: THE FIRST 200 MILLION YEARS". The exhibit ran from 2011 to 2017 when the Penn Museum began preparing for a series of large renovations. In addition to her research at the Penn Museum, Monge continues to conduct fieldwork. She actively excavates along the Swahili cost of Kenya. Her previous fieldwork included sites in Europe and Australia. In the United States, Monge's work has included high profile studies of serial killer H. H. Holmes and the Duffy's Cut mass grave site. Recently, Monge contributed to the largest-ever ancient DNA study illuminating millennia of prehistory in South and Central Asia which was published in 2019.

Monge has appeared in two documentaries: Secrets of the Underground (part of America's Buried Massacre series) and Egypt's Ten Greatest Discoveries. She also contributed to the Nova episode "Neanderthals on Trial".

Selected publications 
Monge J, Kricun M, Radovcic J, Radovcic D, Mann A, Frayer DW. Fibrous dysplasia in a 120,000+ year old Neandertal from Krapina, Croatia. PLoS ONE. 2013;8(6), Art. #e64539. http://dx.doi.org/10.1371/journal.pone.0064539
Monge, J. M., & Ruhli, F. (2015). The anatomy of the mummy: Mortuiviventes docent—When ancient mummies speak to modern doctors. The Anatomical Record, 298, 935–940.
Thompson RC, Allam AH, Lombardi GP, Wann LS, Sutherland ML, Sutherland JD, Soliman MA, Frohlich B, Mininberg DT, Monge JM, Vallodolid CM, Cox SL, Abd El-Maksoud G, Badr I, Miyamoto MI, El-Halim Nur El-Din A, Narula J, Finch CE, Thomas GS: Atherosclerosis across 4000 years of human history: the Horus study of four ancient populations. Lancet. 2013, 381: 1211-1222.
Lewis J. E. DeGusta D. Meyer M. R. Monge J. M. Mann A. E. Holloway R. L . 2011. The mismeasure of science: Stephen Jay Gould vs. Samuel George Morton on skulls and bias. PLoS Biology  9:e1001071, discussed in New York Times June 14, 2011.
Weiner S, Monge J, Mann A (2008) Bipedalism and parturition: An evolutionary imperative for cesarean delivery? Clin Perinatol 35:469–478, ix.

Press Coverage 
Piecing together an ancient biblical site, bone by bone

A new take on the 19th-century skull collection of Samuel Morton

Our Skulls Are Out-Evolving Us

Seeing White: Skulls and Skins

How Two British Orthodontists Became Celebrities to Incels

Move Bombing 
Forensic Science Tested by Philadelphia Inquiry (July 1985)

Remains of children killed in MOVE bombing sat in a box at Penn Museum for decades

Report on the handling of human remains from the 1985 MOVE tragedy

Summary of Findings and Tucker Law Group Official Report of MOVE Investigation at Penn

Final Report of the Independent Investigation into the City of Philadelphia’s Possession of Human Remains of Victims of the 1985 Bombing of the MOVE Organization

She Was Killed by the Police. Why Were Her Bones in a Museum?

References

Living people
Physical anthropologists
Year of birth missing (living people)
American anthropologists
University of Pennsylvania
University of Pennsylvania Museum of Archaeology and Anthropology
American women scientists
American curators
American women curators
Biological anthropology
21st-century American women